Kerch (also Romanized as Kerech and Kerich) is a village in Paskuh Rural District, Sedeh District, Qaen County, South Khorasan Province, Iran. At the 2006 census, its population was 252, in 66 families.

References 

Populated places in Qaen County